The Biwa trout (Oncorhynchus rhodurus) is an anadromous salmonid fish of the genus Oncorhynchus, endemic to Lake Biwa in Shiga Prefecture, Japan, but also introduced to Lake Ashi and Lake Chūzenji. While called trout, the fish is most closely related to the masu salmon (Oncorhynchus masou) of the western Pacific, and is most often considered a subspecies of it, Oncorhynchus masou rhodurus.

Biwa trout is found only in the waters of northern Lake Biwa, and feeds on plankton, freshwater prawns, aquatic insects, worms, ayu and other small fishes, and sometimes small mammals.

Use as food
Biwa trout represents a unique food fish for the Shiga Prefecture. Biwa trout and its caviar are considered a delicacy. Usual ways to prepare the trout is as sashimi, by grilling with salt, in meuniere, or by smoking, deep-frying or simmering, etc.  The fish has a reputation as being very difficult to catch by angling.

References

External links
Yoshikazu Fujioka   Profile of Biwamasu Trout and Seasons of The Mountain Village. www.hi-ho.ne.jp
 Biwa trout information from the National Institute for ES of Japan (Japanese)
 Fishing info. of Biwa trout (Japanese - at Archive.org)

Oncorhynchus
Endemic fauna of Japan
Freshwater fish of Japan
Fish described in 1925
Taxa named by David Starr Jordan